József Krocskó (born 20 April 1968) is a former professional tennis player from Hungary.

Krocskó, who was born in the Ukrainian SSR, won the Hungarian Tennis Championships in 1992 and 1993.

He qualified for his first Grand Slam in 1993, at the French Open, where he was defeated in the opening round by Carlos Costa. His only other Grand Slam appearance was the 1997 French Open. In that tournament, which he entered as a lucky loser, he beat Jan Kroslak in the first round, then lost to Stéphane Simian.

Krocskó took part in 20 Davis Cup singles rubbers for his country, winning nine of them. In 1993 he helped Hungary qualify for the World Group with wins over Alberto Mancini and Javier Frana from Argentina. Another of his best wins came in 1995, when he defeated Mark Philippoussis in the fifth and deciding rubber of their tie, to ensure that Australia was relegated for the first time in Davis Cup history.

Davis Cup

Participations: (9–11)

   indicates the outcome of the Davis Cup match followed by the score, date, place of event, the zonal classification and its phase, and the court surface.

References

1968 births
Living people
Hungarian male tennis players
Hungarian people of Ukrainian descent